Hutt International Boys' School (usually known by its acronym, HIBS) is a state integrated boys' secondary school in Trentham, Upper Hutt, New Zealand  founded in 1991. The school is multi-denominational and affiliated with the Anglican faith.

The current principal is Tom Gordon, who took up the position in January 2022.

History
HIBS was founded in 1991 as a private school, and was then known as Hutt Independent Boys' School, with Barry Kerr as principal. The school was briefly sited in Silverstream, Upper Hutt, on land that later became a rest home. However, due to the lease on the site expiring, the school moved to its present site in Trentham, Upper Hutt in 1994, on land previously owned by the Wellington Racing Club, which included the former Burma Lodge motel. The school also became state integrated the same year.

The school has had many building projects on its current site, with major projects including the school gymnasium in 1996, the schools administration and ICT / Library block with first-floor classrooms in 2004, and the school auditorium and chapel, planned in 2004 and completed in 2008. In 2016 the school undertook a new construction project which included the new Maths and Social Sciences classroom block and was followed by the new Visual Art rooms later in 2017. The same year the English/ICT Block and the school Library were renovated from the inside.

Principal Grahame Duffy started in 2002, serving 11 years and department at the end of the 2013 school year.  He was succeeded by principal Mike Hutchins for the 2014 school year.

At the end of 2021, principal Mike Hutchins announced his resignation after serving 7 years as principal and was succeeded by Tom Gordon in January 2022.

Controversies

School donations 
The school came under fire in 2010 when the then Minister of Education Anne Tolley called an investigation into the "forced" school donation after correspondence showed it was not clear which part of the fees was compulsory and which was a donation. In 2015, HIBS was ranked number 2 in the list of schools receiving the most in school donations in New Zealand, totaling $2,057,620. This contrasted approximately 55 schools in New Zealand which received less than $500 in donations overall. The school has stated that the reasoning for this is that is "the key to small class sizes and hiring extra staff needed for this, beyond the level allowed by Government".

School life

House system
The school has operated a house system since 1996, similar to that used in English public schools. Each house is named after an iconic New Zealander: Freyberg (named after Bernard Freyberg), Halberg (named after Murray Halberg), Rutherford (named after Ernest Rutherford), and Hillary (named after Edmund Hillary). These houses compete against each other in friendly competition for the house cup in a number of events throughout the year.

International service
The school runs an ′International Service′ programme, where each year a group of students complete service by helping others in less fortunate countries.  The group of students perform tasks such as painting school buildings, installing computer systems, building facilities, improving drainage as well as learning about the culture of another country and interacting with its people. HIBS has performed International Service of countries such as Philippines, Mexico, Samoa, Vietnam, Tonga, Cook Islands and Fiji.

Aviation 
The school has an aviation programme, which it has run since 2000. The program allows for students to gain their private pilot licence before they leave school.  As of 2017, the programme has had 24 graduates.

Enrolment 
At the September 2015 Education Review Office (ERO) review of the school, HIBS had 653 students. Most of the students identified themselves as New Zealand European (Pākehā). The ethnic composition was 76% New Zealand European (Pākehā), 7% Māori, and 17% as other ethnic groups.

The school has a socioeconomic decile rating of 10Z, meaning it draws its school community from an area of low socio-economic disadvantage when compared to other New Zealand schools.

Notable alumni
Chris Bishop – Member of Parliament 
Jehan Casinader - journalist and television presenter
 Julian Dennison – actor
 Brannavan Gnanalingam - author
 Dan Keat – footballer
 Drew Neemia – television personality, singer 
 Rachin Ravindra - cricketer
 Michael Wilson – footballer
 Ben Waine – footballer

References

External links

 Official HIBS website 2017

Boys' schools in New Zealand
Educational institutions established in 1991
Secondary schools in the Wellington Region
International schools in New Zealand
Schools in Upper Hutt
1991 establishments in New Zealand